William T. Alexander House is a historic plantation house located near Charlotte, Mecklenburg County, North Carolina. It built between 1820 and 1830, and is a two-story, three bay, brick dwelling with Federal and Georgian style design elements. It has a side-gable roof, sits on a granite foundation, and a center-bay porch added in the 1920s.

It was listed on the National Register of Historic Places in 2003.

References

Houses on the National Register of Historic Places in North Carolina
Federal architecture in North Carolina
Georgian architecture in North Carolina
Houses completed in 1830
Houses in Charlotte, North Carolina
National Register of Historic Places in Mecklenburg County, North Carolina
1830 establishments in North Carolina